Oathbreaker is a Belgian band from Flanders, formed in 2008 and currently signed to Deathwish Inc. The band consists of guitarists Lennart Bossu and Gilles Demolder, drummer Wim Coppers, and vocalist Caro Tanghe who performs both screamed and sung vocals. They are a part of Church of Ra, an artistic collective started by Amenra, a band of which Lennart and Caro are also members. Like Amenra, Oathbreaker emerged from the Belgian underground hardcore punk scene but integrated extreme metal and art music aesthetics.

They have released three studio albums: Mælstrøm (2011), Eros|Anteros (2013) and Rheia (2016). The last two were generally well reviewed, on account of dark atmospheres, extremely intense sound, poetic lyrics, and raw emotion.

History

Formation and early years
Gilles and Caro were childhood friends, meeting when Caro was aged 14. The duo eventually met Lennart Bossu, and formed a band which played in the Belgian hardcore scene, performing live with bands such as Rise and Fall. Over time, their style progressively changed, before parting ways with their drummer. In 2008, they had met Ivo Debrabandere, and evolved into what would become Oathbreaker, writing and releasing their debut EP in 2008.

Debut album and first tours (2008–2012)
Over the course of the next two years, the band had begun to gradually write what would become their debut album, Mælstrøm, coming to rehearsal with small pieces and ideas for songs, combining them together. Before the release of the album, Lennart Bossu said in an interview, "It’s the only way we know how to write songs, even though there are faster ways I’m sure." In the Fall of 2010, the and had met with Michael Neyt, and Lander Cluyse, to engineer and record, and with Kurt Ballou to mix it. Lacking a singular recording location, the album had been recorded in a mix of several studios, and bedrooms. In July 2011, the album was released on Thirty Days To Nights Records, to small critical press, with above average to rave reviews. Most reviews had come to a general agreement that the band had a strong future. They then spent the latter half of 2011 into 2012 touring throughout Germany with Italian band Hierophant, as well as Northern and Eastern Europe with Rise and Fall, and The Secret. In 2012 they began their first US tour, on the east coast, before returning to Europe to begin work on their sophomore album.

Musical style 
Oathbreaker's eclectic style has been associated with various genres within the realms of punk rock, heavy metal and avant-garde music including black metal, post-hardcore, hardcore punk, post-metal, post-black metal, screamo, metalcore, crust punk, d-beat, sludge metal, art metal, shoegazing, and post-rock. It has been compared to that of Cobalt and Ghost Bath as well as Deathwish Inc. labelmates Deafheaven, Converge, Touché Amoré, Loma Prieta, and Planes Mistaken for Stars. Caro Tanghe's vocals have received attention as a prominent aspect of the band's sound; Exclaim noted that her "higher pitched screams rival [Converge's] Jacob Bannon's, while simultaneously being close enough to a black metal shriek, and desperate enough for screamo" while Stereogum praised her singing, stating it is "often melodic, and multi-tracked, and it gives these gigantic songs greater mass and momentum, as well as humanity and maybe even vulnerability." Furthermore, Metal Injection described her lyricism as "haunting and poetic, gothic and honest."

Members
Current
Lennart Bossu – guitar (2008–present)
Gilles Demolder – guitar, bass guitar (2008–present)
Caro Tanghe – vocals (2008–present)
Wim Coppers – drums (2016–present)

Former
Ivo Debrabandere – drums (2008–2016)

Discography

Studio albums
Mælstrøm (2011)
Eros|Anteros (2013)
Rheia (2016)

EPs
Oathbreaker (2008)
Amenra/Oathbreaker – Brethren Bound by Blood 3/3 (2011)
An Audiotree Live Session (2016)

Singles
Ease Me (2020)

Live albums
Live at Vooruit (2015)

Compilations
Metal Swim 2 (2019)

Music videos

References

Belgian black metal musical groups
Post-hardcore groups
Post-metal musical groups
Screamo musical groups
Metalcore musical groups
Belgian crust and d-beat groups
Sludge metal musical groups
Avant-garde music groups
Belgian heavy metal musical groups
Musicians from Ghent
2008 establishments in Belgium
Musical groups established in 2008
Deathwish Inc. artists
Musical quartets